Hwang Mu-kyu (born August 19, 1982) is a South Korean football player who played for Suwon Samsung Bluewings and Gwangju Sangmu Bulsajo.

References

External links

Hwang Mu-kyu at n-league.net

1982 births
Living people
South Korean footballers
Suwon Samsung Bluewings players
Gimcheon Sangmu FC players
Changwon City FC players
K League 1 players
Korea National League players
Association football forwards